Kruševac Airport (Serbian Cyrillic: Аеродром Крушевац, Serbian Latin: Aerodrom Kruševac)  is an airport  south from the city of Kruševac, Serbia. The airport is also known as Rosulje Airport. An attractive approach for landing is also valid for the Krusevac airport, as the route leads through the city and always attracts the attention of the citizens of Krusevac. The option of relocating the aero club to the new location of the Rosulje airport in Parunovac is still open, and by then the existing Kosirsko Polje airport will be in use.

Recent developments

After the transfer of shares and founding rights in the Public Enterprise from the City of Kruševac to the Republic of Serbia, the change was registered with the Agency for Business Registers. In the upcoming period, taking into account the mentioned change, the necessary activities related to business strategy and development plans will be carried out. According to the Spatial Plan of the Republic of Serbia from 2010 to 2020 (Official Gazette of RS 88/10), the location in Kruševac is foreseen as an airport that can be included in the network of regional offers. The approval of the Ministry of Construction, Transport and Infrastructure on the regulatory plan was also obtained.

The airport is located on the Jasikovica plateau and will be intended for domestic air traffic, with the possibility of becoming international, which would also be used for passenger traffic, if the need arises. The Public Enterprise Airports of Serbia, Aerodrom Rosulje, which operated under the jurisdiction of the local self-government since 1995, was transferred to the jurisdiction of the republic in early 2020 and became part of the company Airports of Serbia.

See also
 List of airports in Serbia
 Airports of Serbia
 Transport in Serbia
 AirSerbia

References

External links 
Kruševac airport information (PDF)
Kruševac-Rosulje Airport
Krusevac Airport

Airports in Serbia
Kruševac